Guton  is a mountain on the border of the Republic of Azerbaijan (Balakan and Zagatala districts) and the Russian Federation (Republic of Dagestan). The southern slopes of Guton are included in the frame of the territory of the Zagatala Reserve.

Geography 
The mountain is located on the crest of the Main Caucasian Range. Its height constitutes - 3648 m. On the slopes of Guton, the Samur and Katekhchay rivers originate. Here are subalpine and alpine meadows, while the top of the mountain is rocky.

See also
 Mount Bazardüzü

References

Mount Guton
Mount Guton